Runa Laila (born 17 November 1952) is a Bangladeshi  playback singer and composer. She started her career in Pakistan film industry in the late 1960s. Her style of singing is inspired by Pakistani playback singer Ahmed Rushdi and she also made a pair with him after replacing another singer Mala. Her playback singing in films – The Rain (1976), Jadur Banshi (1977), Accident (1989), Ontore Ontore (1994), Devdas (2013) and Priya Tumi Shukhi Hou (2014) - earned her seven Bangladesh National Film Awards for Best Female Playback Singer. She won the Best Music Composer award for the film Ekti Cinemar Golpo (2018).

Bengali

Hindi

Sindhi

Urdu

As a Composer

film songs

Non-film songs

References

Laila, Runa
Laila, Runa
Laila, Runa